Ananthasagar is a village in Medak mandal of Medak district in the Indian state of Telangana. This village has a population of 79 and has 16 households within it. The nearest town is would be Medak, which is seven kilometers away.

The climate of Ananthasagar includes May being the warmest on average month and December being the coldest. In May it averages around 34.5 degrees Celsius and in December it averages around 23.4 degrees Celsius. The overall climate of Ananthasagar is tropical. The rain is heavier in the summer months than it is in the winter months.

References

Villages in Medak district